Caroline Gülke (born November 3, 1982) is a German former competitive figure skater. She placed eighth at the 1999 World Junior Championships and 24th at the 1999 World Championships. She was coached by Viola Striegler and represented SC Berlin. She retired from competitive skating in 2004 and gave birth to her daughter, Nele, one year later. In 2007, she announced her return to competitive skating at the "Stars und Sternchen" ice show in Berlin. She retired again after withdrawing from the 2010 German Championships.

Gülke appeared in the RTL television show Alles was zählt as a skating double of Christiane Klimt and as herself.

Programs

Results
GP: Grand Prix; JGP: Junior Grand Prix

References

 2001 German Nationals Results

External links
 
 Caroline Gülke at Tracings.net

1982 births
Living people
German female single skaters
Sportspeople from Freiberg